Judith Kaufmann (born 20 September 1962) is a German cinematographer.

Biography
Judith Kaufmann was born in Stuttgart, West Germany in 1962. But after moving with her family grew up in West Berlin. After graduating from the National College of Optics and Photographer in Berlin, she apprenticed as a photographer.

Kaufmann worked in film as a camera assistant under Konrad Kotowski, Thomas Mauch, Gernot Roll, and Raoul Coutard. Since 1982 Kaufmann focused on film, and in 1991 became chief cinematographer.

Filmography

Awards

References

External links

1962 births
Film people from Berlin
Living people
German cinematographers
German women cinematographers
Members of the Academy of Arts, Berlin